Wales Airport  is a privately owned, public use airport located two nautical miles (4 km) south-southwest of the central business district of Wales, a town in Androscoggin County, Maine, United States.

Facilities and aircraft 
Wales Airport covers an area of 500 acres (202 ha) at an elevation of 210 feet (64 m) above mean sea level. It has one runway designated 4/22 with a turf surface measuring 2,100 by 80 feet (640 x 24 m).

For the 12-month period ending December 31, 2010, the airport had 300 general aviation aircraft operations, an average of 25 per month.

References

External links 
 Aerial image as of May 1998 from USGS The National Map
 

Airports in Androscoggin County, Maine